Freakish (subtitled Anthony Coleman Plays Jelly Roll Morton) is a solo album by pianist Anthony Coleman performing compositions by Jelly Roll Morton which was released on the Tzadik label in 2009.

Reception

In his review for Allmusic, arwulf arwulf states "Coleman's readings of "The Crave," "The Pearls," "Frog-I-More," and "Mr. Jelly Lord" are so intelligently and creatively delivered that anyone with the slightest interest in 20th century music really ought to consider making time for this recital".

Track listing
All compositions by Jelly Roll Morton
 "Freakish" - 3:40  
 "Fickle Fay Creep (Soap Suds)" - 5:08  
 "Buffalo Blues (Mr. Joe)" - 3:41  
 "Frances (Fat Frances)" - 3:22  
 "Mr. Jelly Lord" - 4:03  
 "Mamanita" - 4:44  
 "Pretty Lil" - 3:57  
 "The Pearls" - 6:03  
 "Frog-I-More" - 5:22  
 "The Crave" - 3:29  
 "Mama's Got a Baby" - 4:05  
 "Freakish (Version Two)" - 4:21  
 "King Porter Stomp" - 6:25

Personnel
Anthony Coleman - piano

References

Tzadik Records albums
Anthony Coleman albums
2009 albums